Neohesperilla is a genus of skipper butterflies in the family Hesperiidae.

Species
Neohesperilla croceus Miskin, 1889
Neohesperilla senta Miskin, 1891
Neohesperilla xanthomera Meyrick & Lower, 1902
Neohesperilla xiphiphora Lower, 1911

References
Natural History Museum Lepidoptera genus database
Neohesperilla at funet

Trapezitinae
Hesperiidae genera